Dust of Life: A True Ban Vinai Love Story is the first novel of G. Y. Lee. It was first published in the year 2004. It is not clear whether the novel is autobiographical.

It takes you on the romantic journey of Mua, a young Hmong man. Shortly after completing his university studies in Minneapolis, Minnesota, he was asked by Pufua, a refugee girl in Ban Vinai Refugee Camp in Thailand to help sponsor her and her family for settlement in the United States. Although he barely knew her, he travelled to Thailand to see what he could do. It was agreed that if they got on well, he would marry her and apply for her and her family to come and live with him in the USA.

Things are not straightforward and Pufua is reluctant to wed after a series of events in the refugee camp, unbeknownst to Mua. Slowly and surely he begins to work out what has happened.

2004 American novels
American romance novels
Novels set in Thailand
2004 debut novels